Iván Santiago Pérez Maceira (born 16 November 1985) is a Spanish footballer who plays for Alondras CF as an attacking midfielder.

Club career
Pérez was born in Santiago de Compostela, Galicia. After finishing his football formation with Deportivo de La Coruña he made his debut for the first team on 29 August 2009, coming on as a substitute for Juan Carlos Valerón for the final 20 minutes against Real Madrid, in a 2–3 La Liga away loss.

On 23 July 2010, Pérez was loaned to SD Ponferradina, freshly returned to Segunda División. Released by Depor at the end of the season due to several injury problems, he continued playing in his native region, representing Montañeros CF, CD Lugo and SD Compostela. He scored his first goal as a professional on 11 May 2013 while at the service of the second club, but in a 3–5 home defeat to UD Almería.

Subsequently, after a brief spell in the Greek second level with Panegialios FC, Pérez returned to Spain and continued to compete mainly in the Galician lower leagues, representing CF Talavera de la Reina, UD Somozas and Alondras CF.

Club statistics

References

External links

1985 births
Living people
Spanish footballers
Footballers from Santiago de Compostela
Association football midfielders
La Liga players
Segunda División players
Segunda División B players
Tercera División players
Deportivo Fabril players
Deportivo de La Coruña players
SD Ponferradina players
CD Lugo players
SD Compostela footballers
CF Talavera de la Reina players
Football League (Greece) players
Panegialios F.C. players
Spanish expatriate footballers
Expatriate footballers in Greece
Spanish expatriate sportspeople in Greece